Alexander Nübel (born 30 September 1996) is a German professional footballer who plays as a goalkeeper for Ligue 1 club Monaco, on loan from Bayern Munich.

Club career

Early years
Nübel grew up in Salzkotten-Tudorf in East Westphalia, and began playing football at TSV Tudorf. In 2005 he moved to the youth department of SC Paderborn, where he was initially active as an outfield player until under-14 level. Initially with Paderborn, he moved up to the professional squad for the 2014–15 season, but remained inactive throughout the season.

Schalke 04
Nübel then moved to Schalke 04, where he was utilised in the second team competing in the Regionalliga West. On 14 May 2016, he made his Bundesliga debut against TSG Hoffenheim when he replaced Ralf Fährmann after 90 minutes.

Nübel started the season as Schalke's backup goalkeeper to Fährmann. On 24 October 2018, he made his Champions League debut for Schalke in a 0–0 away draw against Galatasaray.

After the winter break, Schalke's head coach Domenico Tedesco, dropped Fährmann as the club's first-choice goalkeeper and promoted Nübel. On 2 February 2019, Nübel was sent off with a straight red card in a match against Borussia Mönchengladbach and was suspended for the club's next two Bundesliga matches. He started in every match for Schalke after he was selected as the first-choice goalkeeper, with the exception of the two matches he was suspended for.

On 6 August 2019, Nübel was selected by Schalke's head coach David Wagner as the club's new captain. He entered the season with only one year left on his contract with Schalke. On 22 December 2019, Schalke revealed that Nübel had informed the club that he would not renew his contract. On 4 January 2020, Nübel agreed to join Bayern Munich on a free transfer at the end of the season. He then handed the captaincy over to Omar Mascarell.

Bayern Munich
Nübel joined Bayern Munich on 30 June 2020. He made his debut for Bayern in the first round of the DFB-Pokal on 15 October where the club defeated fifth division side 1. FC Düren by a score of 3–0. On 1 December 2020, he made his Champions League debut in a 1–1 away draw against Atlético Madrid. On 15 May 2021, he made his Bundesliga debut in a 2–2 away draw against Freiburg.

Loan to Monaco 
On 27 June 2021, Nübel was loaned out to Monaco on a two-season loan, with Bayern having the option to cut the loan short after one season.

Career statistics

Club

Honours
Bayern Munich
 Bundesliga: 2020–21
 DFL-Supercup: 2020
 UEFA Super Cup: 2020

References

External links

 Profile at the AS Monaco FC website
 
 
 

1996 births
Living people
Sportspeople from Paderborn
German footballers
Footballers from North Rhine-Westphalia
Association football goalkeepers
Germany under-21 international footballers
Bundesliga players
Regionalliga players
Ligue 1 players
SC Paderborn 07 players
FC Schalke 04 II players
FC Schalke 04 players
FC Bayern Munich footballers
AS Monaco FC players
German expatriate footballers
German expatriate sportspeople in Monaco
Expatriate footballers in Monaco